Benjamin Beauchamp (21 December 1842 – 3 March 1913) was a Canadian politician.

Born in Saint-Hermas, Canada East, the son of Benjamin Beauchamp and Marie Meloche, Beauchamp was educated at Jacques-Cartier Normal School in Montreal receiving a first-class teachers' certificate. He obtained both classes of certificates at the School of Military Instruction in 1865. An agriculturist, he was secretary of the Agricultural Society of Deux-Montagnes, Quebec.

He was a member of the 5th, 6th, 7th, and 8th Legislative Assembly of Quebec for Deux-Montagnes.

References
 

1842 births
1913 deaths
Conservative Party of Quebec MNAs